Lake Vennandur  is located at west near to Vennandur. North side Lakeshore, South side Lakeshore and East side Lakeshore of lake are located in Vennandur. West side Lakeshore is located in Nachipatti. North and South side Lakeshore length are more than East and West side Lakeshore length.

References

Vennandur block
Vennandur